Clifton Folkes (born 16 September 1970) is a Jamaican cricketer. He played in three first-class and three List A matches for the Jamaican cricket team from 1990 and 1993.

See also
 List of Jamaican representative cricketers

References

External links
 

1970 births
Living people
Jamaican cricketers
Jamaica cricketers
People from Saint Elizabeth Parish